The 2022 South American Rugby League Championship was the fourth edition of the tournament and was held in Jericó, Colombia between 25 and 27 November 2022. The teams participating in the tournament were Brazil, Chile and Colombia. Brazil won the tournament, winning both their games.

Participants

Table

Fixtures

References 

2022 in rugby league
Rugby league in South America
South American Rugby League Championship
South American Rugby League Championship
2022 in Brazilian sport
2022 in Chilean sport